Heqing may refer to:

 Heqing County (鹤庆县), Dali Prefecture, Yunnan, China
 Heqing, Hainan (和庆镇), a town in Hainan, China
 Heqing, Shanghai (合庆镇), a town in Pudong, Shanghai, China
 Cai Yuanpei (1868–1940), also known by his courtesy name of Heqing (鶴卿), former president of Peking University